Spur 69 is a short, unsigned, four-lane state-maintained roadway in Austin, Texas. It forms a link between RM 2222 and US 290 at I-35. Spur 69 is signed over its entire length as RM 2222, rather than as Spur 69.

Between 1939 and 1945, Spur 69 referred to a short section of what is now SH 12 near Deweyville. The current location in Austin was first assigned in 1969.

In 1990, Spur 69 was redesignated as SH 169; the designation was reverted to Spur 69 in 1991. There already was a SH 69 at the time.

Route description
Spur 69 begins at an intersection with North Lamar Boulevard in Austin, Travis County, where the roadway continues northwest as RM 2222. From here, the highway heads southeast as West Koenig Lane, a four-lane divided highway signed as RM 2222. The road passes businesses before heading into residential areas with some commercial establishments, becoming East Koenig Lane. Spur 69 crosses the Capital MetroRail Red Line, turning east and becoming an undivided freeway with frontage roads. The highway reaches an interchange with Airport Boulevard south of the Highland Mall and becomes a divided highway again as it comes to a large interchange with I-35/US 290. It is east of this interchange that Spur 69 ends and the freeway continues east as part of US 290.

History
Spur 69 was first designated in Deweyville, Newton County on September 26, 1939, running from SH 87 to the Sabine River as a renumbering of SH 87A. This road was replaced with a portion of SH 235 on October 27, 1945, which became SH 12 on August 27, 1959. The current Spur 69 was designated on January 21, 1969 to run from I-35 west to Koenig Lane near the Southern Pacific railroad tracks. The highway was extended west 0.7 miles to its current western terminus at RM 2222 and North Lamar Boulevard on January 31, 1972. On October 17, 1989, Spur 69 was replaced with SH 169 (a proposed freeway) upon these requirements: local support as exhibited by the passage of a referendum election; and the City of Austin's support of a west/east controlled access facility in this corridor. These requirements were not met, so the designation reverted to Spur 69 on July 19, 1990.

Junction list

References

069
Transportation in Travis County, Texas